This is a list of Mexican football transfers for the 2021-22 winter transfer window, grouped by club. It includes football transfers related to clubs from the Liga BBVA MX.

Liga BBVA MX

América

In:

Out:

Atlas

In:

Out:

Atlético San Luis

In:

Out:

Cruz Azul

In:

Out:

Guadalajara

In:

Out:

Juárez

In:

Out:

León

In:

Out:

Mazatlán

In:

Out:

Monterrey

In:

Out:

Necaxa

In:

Out:

Pachuca

In:

Out:

Puebla

In:

Out:

Querétaro

In:

Out:

Santos Laguna

In:

Out:

Tijuana

In:

Out:

Toluca

In:

Out:

UANL

In:

Out:

UNAM

In:

Out:

References 

Winter 2021-22
Tran